Rodolfo Paolo Suárez Díaz (born 6 Jun 1980 in Montevideo) is a Uruguayan-Salvadoran professional football player who plays as a midfielder.

He is the eldest brother of footballer Luis Suárez, who plays for Gremio and the Uruguay national team.

Club career
Suárez played his 200th game in the round 15 match of the Salvadoran League against Once Municipal, having made his debut in 2005 against San Salvador F.C.

He has a strong relationship with his brother and is in regular contact with him.

In January 2013, Suárez signed for Guatemalan side Comunicaciones, on a one-year-long loan deal, which triggered a clause on his contract with parent club A.D. Isidro Metapán, which extended his deal for one year.

On 2016, Suárez moved to Primera Division newcomer C.D. Sonsonate. He played 1 seasons and left the club. He returned to Isidro Metapán in 2017.

Suárez announced his retirement from football in May 2018, he played 368 games and 73 goals in the primera division of El Salvador, he won twelve domestic titles; 7 with Isidro Metapan and 5 with Comunicaciones.

Honours

Player

Club
C.D. FAS
 Primera División
 Runners-up: Apertura 2006

A.D. Isidro Metapán
 Primera División
 Champion: Clausura 2007, Apertura 2008, Clausura 2009, Clausura 2010, Apertura 2010, Apertura 2011
 Runners-up: Apertura 2005

References

External links
 

1980 births
Living people
Footballers from Montevideo
Uruguayan footballers
Uruguay under-20 international footballers
Uruguayan expatriate footballers
Association football forwards
Categoría Primera A players
Deportivo Maldonado players
C.D. FAS footballers
A.D. Isidro Metapán footballers
Comunicaciones F.C. players
Expatriate footballers in El Salvador
Uruguayan expatriate sportspeople in Colombia
Expatriate footballers in Colombia
Expatriate footballers in Guatemala